Jesse Robinson (born October 30, 1983), better known by his stage name Nacho Picasso, is an American rapper born in San Francisco, California and raised in Seattle, Washington. He is a member of the Moor Gang rap collective. He has notably released several collaborative albums with Blue Sky Black Death. The Seattle Times has described him as "our new anti-hero: a party-hardy street-boss misogynist, whose songs are full of dark humor."

Career
In 2011, Nacho Picasso released For the Glory. In January 2012, he released Lord of the Fly, which was followed by Exalted in June that year. For the Glory, Lord of the Fly, and Exalted were produced by Blue Sky Black Death. In November 2012, he released Black Narcissus.

In June 2013, Nacho Picasso released a collaborative album with rapper Avatar Darko, titled Vampsterdam. In October 2013, he released the album High & Mighty, which included production from Jake One, Cardiak, and Vitamin D, among others. It was led by the street single "Crime Waves", produced by Swiff-D.

In January 2014, Nacho Picasso released a 7-track project titled Trances with Wolves, which featured guest appeacences by Avatar Darko and Gifted Gab and included production from Jake One and Raised by Wolves, among others. In April 2014, he released a single titled "David Blowie" produced by Raised by Wolves, which samples David Bowie's "Within You", a song from the soundtrack for Labyrinth.

In January 2015, Nacho Picasso's fourth collaborative album with Blue Sky Black Death, titled Stoned & Dethroned, was released on Surf School Recordings. In May that year, he released The Witchtape, a collaborative EP with 88 Ultra.

In 2018, he released an EP, Role Model, which included production from Harry Fraud and a guest appearance from Riff Raff. In 2019, he released Nachferatu.

Discography

Studio albums
 Blunt Raps (2010)
 Ziploc Hip-Hop (2011) 
 For the Glory (2011) 
 Lord of the Fly (2012) 
 Exalted (2012) 
 Black Narcissus (2012)
 Vampsterdam (2013) 
 High & Mighty (2013)
 Trances with Wolves: The Prixtape (2014)
 Stoned & Dethroned (2015) 
 Blunt Raps 2 (2015)
 P.T.S.D. (2016) 
 AntiHero Vol. 1 (2016)
 AntiHero Vol. 2 (2017)
 Nachferatu (2019)

Compilation albums
 Radio Edits (2012)

EPs
 The Witchtape (2015) 
 Role Model (2018)

Singles
 "Gone till November" (2010)
 "Numbnuts" (2011)
 "Sweaters" (2011)
 "Crime Waves" (2013)
 "Nacho Man" (2013)
 "David Blowie" (2014)
 "Adventure Time" (2014)
 "In the Trump" (2014)
 "DB Shooter" (2014)
 "Big Ass Titties" (2014)

Guest appearances
 Jarv Dee - "The Code", "Status", and "Moor Returns" from Dopamine (2012)
 Deniro Farrar - "Walkin' Out" from Destiny Altered (2012)
 Sam Lachow - "Cold" from Avenue Music (2012)
 Sax G - "E(iluvme)go" from Pootey Brown Is... (2012)
 Mac Shine - "Keep It Sweet" from Free Lunch (2012)
 Thaddeus David - "Sir Lancelot" from Trapital Trill (2012)
 Chief - "Tat My Name" from Been Chiefin (2012)
 Blue Sky Black Death & Deniro Farrar - "Hold Me Down" from Cliff of Death (2012)
 Blue Sky Black Death - "Feelin' Right" from Skull and Bones (2012)
 Ayelogics - "Monuments" from Odd Man Out (2013)
 Th3rdz - "Pushin" from This That & Th3rdz (2013)
 Mr. MFN Exquire - "Tomorrow's Gone" from Kismet (2013)
 Jarell Perry - "First Time" from Simple Things (2013)
 Steezie Nasa - "Art of War" from Moor Militia (2013)
 Thaddeus David - "Change Your Ways" from None the Less (2013)
 Blue Sky Black Death - "Keys" (2013)
 Key Nyata - "My Way Sidewayz" from The Shadowed Diamond (2013)
 .Cult - "Rose Beds" from #YFB (2014)
 Gifted Gab - "Pay Me" from Girl Rap (2014)
 Sadistik - "Witching Hour" from Ultraviolet (2014)
 Deniro Farrar & Young God - "Keys" from Cliff of Death II (2015)
 Slightly Flagrant (Macntaj and Taane JR) - "Bar of Soap" from Slightly Flagrant (2016)
 Sadistik - "You Dead" from Salo Sessions (2016) 
 Midas Wright - "Know Nobody" from The Psychotic Erotic (2016)
 S.A.S. x Blue Sky Black Death - "Nephilim Giants" from Celestial (2016)

References

External links
 
 

Living people
1983 births
Rappers from Seattle
African-American male rappers
21st-century American rappers
21st-century American male musicians
21st-century African-American musicians
20th-century African-American people